Oba Lateef Adeniran Akanni, Obaarun-Oladekan I (3 December 1958 – 7 January 2022) was a Nigerian monarch. He was the Oba of Ado & Olofin Adimula Oodua of Ado-Odo and the traditional ruler of the Yoruba kingdom of Ado-Odo. He was installed as Oba of Ado & Olofin Adimula Oodua of Ado-Odo on 2 May 2009 holding the reignal name Ojikutujoye Obaarun Oladekan I, succeeding the deceased Oba J. O. Akapo, who died on 7 February 1989.

Before Coronation
Oba J. O. Akapo died in 1989, and it was the turn of the House of Idobarun to produce the candidate that will be installed as the Olofin. The selection process was delayed till 1993, of which Abdul-Lateef Adeniran Akanni was selected through due process. Another candidate from the maternal line of House of Idobarun who was eyeing the position caused an internal crisis which led the matter to the court of law. From the High Court to the Court of Appeal and finally to the apex court of the land, the Supreme Court of Nigeria. Finally, Abdul-Lateef Adeniran Akanni was pronounced as the Olofin elect on 12 January 2009 at the Supreme Court of Nigeria.

Coronation 
Lateef Akanni succeeded Olofin Agunloye Jacob Ogabi Akapo on 2 May 2009, during the regime of Otunba Gbenga Daniel as the Executive Governor of Ogun State after twenty years that the stool has been vacant.

References

Yoruba royalty
Living people
Nigerian Muslims
Oba of Ado
1958 births